Katsuji is both a masculine Japanese given name and a surname. Notable people with the name include:

Given name
, better known as Mr. Hito, Japanese professional wrestler
, Japanese photographer
Katsuji Hasegawa (born 1946), Japanese golfer
, Japanese swimmer
, Japanese illustrator and manga artist
Katsuji Miyazaki (abt. 1915–1993), Japanese engineer
, Japanese voice actor
, Japanese ice hockey player
, Japanese animator
, Japanese basketball player
, Japanese kickboxer, martial artist and professional wrestler
, Japanese boxer

Surname
 (born 1986), Japanese actor

See also
15368 Katsuji, a main-belt minor planet

Japanese-language surnames
Japanese masculine given names